"Somebody New" is a song written by Alex Harvey and Mike Curtis, and recorded by American country music singer, Billy Ray Cyrus. It was released in September 1993 as the second single from his platinum-selling second album, It Won't Be the Last. The song was the follow-up to "In the Heart of a Woman". "Somebody New" reached a peak of number 9 on the Billboard Hot Country Singles & Tracks (now Hot Country Songs chart), and number 4 on the U.S. Bubbling Under Hot 100 chart. It also gained play in Canada, where it reached number 14.

Chart performance

References

1993 singles
1993 songs
Billy Ray Cyrus songs
Mercury Records singles